Selma van de Perre-Velleman (born 7 June 1922) is a Dutch–British resistance fighter. During the Second World War she worked as a courier, a term that at the time acquired a specific connotation as "messenger of the resistance".

Early life

Van de Perre is the daughter of Jewish actor, singer, and presenter Barend Velleman and Fem Spier. Van de Perre had two older brothers, David and Louis, and a younger sister, Clara. The family was liberal and, while Jewish, were not practicing Jews. Her eldest brother sailed with the Dutch Steamboat Company during the war, while her youngest brother was in England. In 1942, Van de Perre was called to report to work in a fur factory that supplied the German army, but she managed to get an exemption. When her father was arrested later that year and taken to Camp Westerbork, Selma helped her mother and sister go into hiding in Eindhoven.

Resistance

After her mother and sister Clara were arrested in 1943, Van de Perre became a member of the "TD Group", a Dutch resistance organization. Van de Perre operated under the alias Wil Buter, and later as Margareta ("Marga") van der Kuit, performing courier work throughout the Netherlands. In June 1944, she was betrayed and arrested. Van de Perre was interned as a political prisoner, because officials did not know of her Jewish heritage. Van de Perre was sent to Ravensbrück concentration camp via Camp Vught. While interned she was severely beaten. After her recovery she applied for work in the production hall of Siemens & Halske AG, because the conditions there were known to be slightly better. On April 23, 1945, Van de Perre was liberated in Ravensbrück and, through the Swedish Red Cross, taken to Gothenburg. Once there, she revealed that her name was not Marga van der Kuit, but Selma Velleman. Upon her return to the Netherlands, Van de Perre learned that her parents and sister had been murdered in Auschwitz and Sobibór.

Post war
In 1947, Van de Perre secured a job at the Dutch embassy in London with the assistance of her brother David. Van de Perre went on to study anthropology and sociology. After graduating, Van de Perre became a teacher of sociology and mathematics at Sacred Heart High School, Hammersmith, London. She subsequently began work at the BBC Radio Netherlands as a journalist. There she met her future husband, Hugo Van de Perre, a Belgian journalist. He was the son of the founder of De Standaard, Alfons Van de Perre. They married in 1955. When her husband died suddenly in 1979, she continued his work as a foreign correspondent. Until her retirement, Van de Perre worked as a journalist for the BBC and as a correspondent for AVRO Televizier and De Standaard. She later became a British citizen.

Since 1995, Van de Perre has gone to Ravensbrück for one week every year to talk about the war with Dutch and German students. At the urging of her brothers' children, she began writing her autobiography, My Name is Selma, in 2003. Her book was released in the Netherlands in 2020 under the title Mijn naam is Selma.

In 1983 Van de Perre was awarded the Resistance Memorial Cross, a medal awarded in the Netherlands to members of the Dutch resistance during the Second World War.

In 2021 she was awarded the Order of Orange-Nassau by the Dutch government. She turned 100 on 7 June 2022.

References

1922 births
Dutch Jews
Dutch resistance members
Women in war in the Netherlands
Ravensbrück concentration camp survivors
Dutch journalists
Knights of the Order of Orange-Nassau
20th-century Dutch women
Living people
Dutch centenarians
Dutch emigrants to the United Kingdom
Women centenarians